Human Capital is a 2019 American-Italian drama film directed by Marc Meyers. The screenplay by Oren Moverman is based on the 2004 Stephen Amidon novel of the same name, which was also adapted into the 2013 Italian film by Paolo Virzì. The film stars Liev Schreiber, Marisa Tomei, Peter Sarsgaard, Maya Hawke, Alex Wolff, Betty Gabriel, Aasif Mandvi, Paul Sparks and Fred Hechinger.

The lives of two different families collide when their children begin a relationship that leads to a tragic accident.

The film premiered on September 10, 2019 at the Toronto International Film Festival. It was released through DirecTV Cinema on February 20, 2020, before being theatrically released on July 17, 2020, by Vertical Entertainment.

Cast

Production
A film adaptation of Human Capital was first developed in 2004. Film producer Lemore Syvan, of Elevation Filmworks, purchased the film rights to the book and hired Noam Murro to direct. The original author Stephen Amidon was picked to adapt the book.

It was announced in October 2018 that Liev Schreiber and Alex Wolff were cast to star in the film, with Marc Meyers directing. Filming began in New York City in November, with Marisa Tomei, Peter Sarsgaard, Maya Hawke and Betty Gabriel also joining. Paul Sparks, Aasif Mandvi and Fred Hechinger were added in December. The film was produced by Celine Rattray and Trudie Styler of Maven Pictures and Bert Marcus of Bert Marcus Film.

Release
Human Capital premiered at the Toronto International Film Festival on September 10, 2019. Shortly after, Vertical Entertainment and DirecTV Cinema acquired distribution rights to the film. It was released through DirecTV Cinema on March 20, 2020, followed by a limited theatrical release on July 17, 2020.

Reception
The site's critical consensus reads, "Human Capital merely rumbles when it ought to roar to life, but it remains a solidly made opportunity for a strong cast to highlight its impressive talents." On Metacritic, the film holds a rating of 51 out of 100 based on 10 critics, indicating "mixed or average reviews".

Writing in The Hollywood Reporter, John Defore said that it is "engrossing on a moment-to-moment scale" but "doesn't click together".  Noel Murray of the Los Angeles Times wrote that each storyline is "gripping until they peter out".  The New York Times critic, Wesley Morris, called it "a character study that hasn’t done its homework".  Alan Ng of Film Threat wrote that the film is "a fantastic study of people being pushed to their limits" and has "a series of excellent performances".  Hannah Hoolihan of Screen Rant wrote, "Meyers' disjointed approach to Human Capital expertly weaves its story into a gripping mystery that's further elevated by exceptional performances."

References

External links
 
 
 
 

2019 films
American drama films
Italian drama films
Films shot in New York City
Vertical Entertainment films
Films produced by Trudie Styler
American remakes of Italian films
Films directed by Marc Meyers
2010s English-language films
2010s American films